Królikowice may refer to:
Królikowice, Lower Silesian Voivodeship (south-west Poland)
Królikowice, Lubusz Voivodeship (west Poland)